Ben Meehan (born 21 January 1993) is an Australian rugby union player. He plays as a scrum-half for Gloucester in Premiership Rugby.

Career
Meehan had a strong youth rugby pedigree, representing his home state of Queensland at a number of age-levels and this eventually ended in him being handed a place in the Queensland Reds academy for 2013.   He picked up some invaluable experience in his year there, including an appearance against Junior Japan in the 2013 IRB Pacific Rugby Cup.   During this time he also played Club Rugby for Sunnybank in the Queensland Premier Rugby competition and had  a brief spell in rugby league with the Melbourne Storm where he was a regular with the club's under 20s.

He was handed his big break ahead of the 2014 Super Rugby season when he was named as a member of the Melbourne Rebels extended playing squad.

On 1 June 2017 it was announced that he had signed for English Premiership side London Irish. Meehan is an England-qualified player through grandparents from Yorkshire. He left London Irish for personal reasons on 27 April 2021.

On 16 July 2021, Meehan returns to the Premiership Rugby competition with Gloucester from the 2021-22 season

International
Meehan was a member of the Australia Under-20 side which competed in the 2013 IRB Junior World Championship in France.

Super Rugby statistics

References

1993 births
Living people
Australian rugby union players
Rugby union scrum-halves
Melbourne Rebels players
Melbourne Rising players
London Irish players
Rugby union players from Brisbane
People educated at Brisbane State High School
Australian people of English descent
Australian expatriate rugby union players
Expatriate rugby union players in England